Pati Point is the easternmost point of Guam. It is located in the far north of the island, close to Andersen Air Force Base. A long reef-protected bay lies to the west of Pati Point, separating it from the island's northernmost point, Ritidian Point.

Geography of Guam